Liechtenstein competed at the 1960 Summer Olympics in Rome, Italy. Five competitors, all men, took part in six events in three sports.

Athletics

Men's Competition
 Alois Büchel
 Egon Oehri

Cycling

One cyclist represented Liechtenstein in 1960.

Individual road race
 Adolf Heeb

Shooting

Two shooters represented Liechtenstein in 1960.

50 m rifle, three positions
 Gustav Kaufmann
 Guido Wolf

50 m rifle, prone
 Guido Wolf
 Gustav Kaufmann

References

External links
Official Olympic Reports

Nations at the 1960 Summer Olympics
1960
1960 in Liechtenstein